Profundiconus neotorquatus is a species of sea snail, a marine gastropod mollusk in the family Conidae, the cone snails and their allies.

Like all species within the genus Profundiconus, these cone snails are predatory and venomous. They are capable of "stinging" humans, therefore live ones should be handled carefully or not at all.

Description
The length of the shell varies between 50 mm and 111 mm.

Distribution
This marine species occurs in the Indian Ocean off Madagascar and Somalia

References

 da Motta, A. J. (1985 ["1984"]). Two new Conus species. La Conchiglia. 17(190/191): 26–28
 Filmer R.M. (2001). A Catalogue of Nomenclature and Taxonomy in the Living Conidae 1758 - 1998. Backhuys Publishers, Leiden. 388pp.
 Tucker J.K. & Tenorio M.J. (2013) Illustrated catalog of the living cone shells. 517 pp. Wellington, Florida: MdM Publishing
 Monnier E., Tenorio M.J., Bouchet P. & Puillandre N. (2018). The cones (Gastropoda) from Madagascar "Deep South": composition, endemism and new taxa. Xenophora Taxonomy. 19: 25–75

External links
 Martens E. von. (1901). Einige Neue Meer-Conchylien von der Deutschen Tiefsee-Expedition. Sitzungsberichte der Gesellschaft Naturforschender Freunde zu Berlin. (1901): 14–26
  Tenorio M. (2016). The genus Profundiconus: Cone snails from the deep sea. 4th International Cone Meeting – Brussels, 2016
 
 Specimen in MNHN, Paris

neotorquatus
Gastropods described in 1985